Ishq Hamari Galiyon Mein is a 2013 Pakistani soap television series broadcast on Hum TV.

Plot
Rashid is a conservative man, not in the support of getting education to women. He has two daughters, Falak and Sitara. Despite, her father's thinking Falak determines to get education. Her mother, Amna convinces her father to allow to get education at least a daughter. In this way, Falak starts his study. She goes in neighborhood, in a professor's house where she falls for Haroon, son of professor. On the other hand, Rashid tries to married him to another boy to which she disagrees and elopes from her house wit Haroon.

Cast
 Sidra Batool as Falak
 Humayun Ashraf as Haroon
 Sanam Chaudhry as Sitara, Falak's Sister
 Yasir Shoro as Saad, Sitara's Husband
 Kashif Mehmood as Rashid, Falak's Father
 Javeria Abbasi as Aamna, Falak's Mother
 Tabbasum Arif as Nuzhat	
 Yasir Ali Khan as Awais, Falak's ex-husband
 Salma Qadir as Teacher
 Farah Nadeem as Farzana, Haroon's mother
 Saife Hassan as Saad's father
 Rimal Kazmi (Child Artist) as Haidar

International broadcast
It was telecast on Zindagi TV channel in India under the title, Yeh Galiyan Yeh Chaubara, from 8 December 2014.

Accolades 
 2nd Hum Awards-Best Soap Actor-Humayun Ashraf
 2nd Hum Awards-Best Soap Actress-Sidra Batool-Nominated

References

External links 
 Official website

Hum TV original programming
Urdu-language telenovelas
Pakistani telenovelas
Zee Zindagi original programming
2013 Pakistani television series debuts
Pakistani television soap operas
2014 Pakistani television series endings